The Egge Hills, or just the Egge (die Egge) is a range of forested hills, up to , in the east of the German state of North Rhine-Westphalia.

Geography

The Egge extends from the southern tip of the Teutoburg Forest range near Horn-Bad Meinberg and Steinheim, Westphalia southwards to the northern parts of the Sauerland near Marsberg. Its highest point is the Preußischer Velmerstot at an altitude of 468m. It is part of the Lower Saxon Hills and one of the two main lines of hills within the Teutoburg Forest / Egge Hills Nature Park.

It also constitutes part of the watershed between the rivers Rhine and Weser.

References

External links

Hill ranges of Germany
Mountains and hills of North Rhine-Westphalia
Natural regions of the Upper Weser Uplands